West Wittering was an electoral ward of Chichester District, West Sussex, England that returned two members to sit on Chichester District Council.

Following a district boundary review, it was merged into the new The Witterings ward in 2019.

Councillors

Election results

References

External links
 Chichester District Council
 Election Maps

Former wards of Chichester District